Pattie Maes (born 1961) is a professor in MIT's program in Media Arts and Sciences. She founded and directed the MIT Media Lab's Fluid Interfaces Group. Previously, she founded and ran the Software Agents group. She served for several years as both the head and associate head of the Media Lab's academic program. Prior to joining the Media Lab, Maes was a visiting professor and a research scientist at the MIT Artificial Intelligence Lab. She holds bachelor's and PhD degrees in computer science from the Vrije Universiteit Brussel in Belgium.

Maes' areas of expertise are human–computer interaction, intelligent interfaces and ubiquitous computing. Maes is the editor of three books, and is an editorial board member and reviewer for numerous professional journals and conferences.

She has received several awards: Newsweek magazine named her one of the "100 people for the new century"; TIME Digital selected her as a member of the Cyber-Elite (the top 50 technological pioneers of the high-tech world); the World Economic Forum honored her with the title Global Leader for Tomorrow; Ars Electronica awarded her the 1995 World Wide Web category prize; and in 2000 she was recognized with the Lifetime Achievement Award by the Massachusetts Interactive Media Council. In 1997, Maes was listed in People Magazine's annual 50 Most Beautiful People feature.

Maes is married to computer graphics researcher Karl Sims.

Books
 Designing Autonomous Agents: Theory and Practice from Biology to Engineering and Back. MIT Press, 1991, 
 Artificial Life IV: Proceedings of the Fourth International Workshop on the Synthesis and Simulation of Living Systems, Rodney Brooks & Pattie Maes, MIT Press, 1994,

References

External links

 Home page at MIT Media Lab
MIT Media Lab research group
 
 

Belgian women computer scientists
Scientists from Brussels
1961 births
Living people
Vrije Universiteit Brussel alumni
MIT School of Architecture and Planning faculty
MIT Media Lab people
20th-century Belgian scientists
21st-century Belgian scientists